is a Japanese football player. She plays for Tokyo Verdy Beleza in the WE League and the Japan national team.

Club career
Miura was born in Kawasaki on 3 July 1997. She joined L.League club Nippon TV Beleza from youth team in 2016. She played many matches from first season and the club won the champions for 2 years in a row (2016-2017).

National team career
In September 2013, Miura was selected Japan U-17 national team for 2013 AFC U-16 Women's Championship. She scored 2 goals including opening goal at the final and Japan team won the champions for 2 tournaments in a row. In August 2015, she was selected Japan U-20 national team for 2015 AFC U-19 Women's Championship and Japan placed first. In November 2016, she was selected U-20 Japan for 2016 U-20 Women's World Cup. At this tournament, she played 5 matches and Japan won the 3rd place.

On 10 June 2018, Miura debuted for the Japan national team against New Zealand. She played 5 games for Japan.

Tokyo 2020 Olympics
In 2021, Miura played on the Japan national team for women's football in the Tokyo 2020 Olympic games.

National team statistics

References

External links

Japan Football Association
Nippon TV Beleza

1997 births
Living people
Association football people from Kanagawa Prefecture
Japanese women's footballers
Japan women's international footballers
Nadeshiko League players
Nippon TV Tokyo Verdy Beleza players
Women's association football midfielders
2019 FIFA Women's World Cup players
Footballers at the 2020 Summer Olympics
Olympic footballers of Japan